Electric(al) devices are devices that functionally rely on electric energy (AC or DC) to drive their core parts (electric motors, transformers, lighting, rechargeable batteries, control electronics). They can be contrasted with traditional mechanical devices which depend on different power sources like fuels or human physical strength. Electronic devices are a specialized kind of electrical devices in which electric power is predominantly used for data processing rather than the generation of mechanical forces. To better differentiate between both classes, electric devices that emphasize physical work are also called electromechanical. Mechatronics accentuates the intersection of both fields.

Together, electronic and electric devices, their development, maintenance, and power supply comprise the subject of electrical engineering.

The majority of electric devices in households is stationary and — due to their considerable power consumption — relies on electrical installation, especially electric outlets instead of small electric generators, batteries, rechargeable or not.

Due to their dependence on electric power sources, in general well-evolved power grids, electric devices and their power consumption pattern have moved into the focus of smart metering.

Electrical equipment

Electrical equipment includes any machine powered by electricity. It usually consists of an enclosure, a variety of electrical components, and often a power switch. Examples of these include:
Lighting
Major appliance
Small appliances
IT equipment (computers, printers etc.)
Motors, pumps and HVAC Systems

More specifically, electrical equipment refers to the individual components of an electrical distribution system. These components may involve:
Electric switchboards
Distribution boards
Circuit breakers and disconnects
Transformers
Electricity meter

See also

Electrical equipment in hazardous areas
Electrical equipment
Power transmission
Electrical room
Grounding kit
List of largest manufacturing companies by revenue

References

Literature

Electrical engineering
 
Electric power distribution